Character Assassination is the eighth solo album by Australian guitarist and songwriter Ed Kuepper recorded in 1994 and released on the Hot label. Early pressings of the album were released with an additional disc Death to the Howdy-Doody Brigade containing the undubbed master versions of all songs but one from Character Assassination and one new song.

Reception
The album spent 3 weeks in the Australian charts in 1994 peaking at number 32. Character Assassination was nominated for an ARIA for the Best Independent Release at the ARIA Music Awards of 1995 and Kuepper was nominated for Best Male Artist.

The Allmusic review by Ned Raggett awarded the album 4 stars and states "Kuepper once again demonstrates his talent for instantly appealing, addictive music on Character Assassination. The whole album is for the most part a stripped-down experience, not an unplugged or wholly acoustic effort by any means and often taking a faster pace, but eschewing Kuepper's fiercer guitar work and fuller arrangements for a calmer, less explosive turn".

Track listing
All compositions by Ed Kuepper except as indicated
 "By the Way" - 4:03
 "Little Fiddle (and the Ghost of Xmas Past)" - 4:23
 "Cockfighter" - 3:43
 "My Best Interests at Heart" - 4:27
 "Take It by the Hand" - 3:46
 "La Di Doh" - 5:07
 "I'm with You" - 3:07
 "Ill Wind" - 6:37
 "So Close to Certainty" - 4:44
 "A Good Soundtrack (Pushin' Fear)" - 3:36
 "Ring of Fire" (June Carter Cash, Merle Kilgore) - 4:04
 "If I Had a Ticket" - 2:40
Bonus Disc: Death to the Howdy-Doody Brigade
 "By the Way" - 4:03
 "Little Fiddle (and the Ghost of Xmas Past) - 4:23
 "Cockfighter" - 3:43
 "My Best Interests at Heart" - 4:27
 "Take It by the Hand" - 3:46
 "La Di Doh" - 5:07
 "I'm with You" - 3:07
 "Ill Wind" - 6:37
 "So Close to Certainty" - 4:44
 "A Good Soundtrack (Pushin' Fear)" - 3:36
 "Ring of Fire" (Cash, Kilgore) - 4:04
 "Number 10" - 2:40
Recorded at Electric Avenue Studio, Rozelle, Sydney, Australia.

Charts

Personnel
Ed Kuepper - vocals, acoustic guitar, electric guitar, elastic stringed guitar, bass, bottle
Mark Dawson - drums, percussion
Barry Turnbull - bass
Linda Neil - violin
Naomi Star, Toni Mott - backing vocals
Miroslav Bukovsky, Julian Gough, Herb Cannon - horn section
Charlie McMahon - didgeridoo
Jim Conway - harmonica, jaw harp
Peter Burgess - washboard

References

Hot Records albums
Ed Kuepper albums
1994 albums